Eugene Butler may refer to:

 Eugene Butler (serial killer) (1849–1913), American serial killer 
 Eugene Joseph Butler (1900–1981), Irish-born Spiritan priest and bishop in Africa
 Eugene Butler, actor in the Baby Burlesks film series